John Mullarkey is the Professor in Film and Television at Kingston University, London, and a member of The London Graduate School.

Mullarkey's work explores variations of "non-standard-philosophy", arguing that philosophy is a subject that continually shifts its identity through engaging with (supposedly) "non-philosophical" fields such as film. Mullarkey's work notably engages with that of François Laruelle and Henri Bergson.

He is an editor of the journal Film-Philosophy, and chair of the Society for European Philosophy.

Select bibliography
 Mullarkey, John and Lord, Beth, eds. (2013) The Bloomsbury Companion to Continental Philosophy. London, U.K. : Bloomsbury. 432p. (Bloomsbury Companions) 
 Mullarkey, John and Smith, Anthony Paul, eds. (2012) Laruelle and non-philosophy. Edinburgh, U.K. : Edinburgh University Press. 272p. (Critical Connections) 
 Mullarkey, John (2009) Refractions of reality: philosophy and the moving image. Basingstoke, U.K. : Palgrave-Macmillan. 282p. 
 Mullarkey, John (2006) Post-Continental Philosophy: An Outline. London, U.K. : Continuum. 272p. (Transversals: New Directions in Philosophy) 
 Ansell Pearson, Keith and Mullarkey, John, eds. (2002) Henri Bergson: key writings. London, U.K. : Continuum. 402p. (Athlone Contemporary European Thinkers) 
 Mullarkey, John (2000) Bergson and Philosophy. Notre Dame, U.S.A. : University of Notre Dame Press. 224p.

References

Mass media theorists
Academics of Kingston University
Living people
Year of birth missing (living people)